Cranbrook School may mean:

Cranbrook Schools, an independent, co-educational, day and boarding school in Bloomfield Hills, Michigan, United States.  It is part of the Cranbrook Educational Community
Cranbrook School, Ilford, a co-educational independent school in Greater London, England
Cranbrook School, Kent, is a voluntary aided non-denominational boarding and day co-educational grammar school in Kent, England
Cranbrook School, Sydney is an independent, K-12 day and boarding school in Sydney, Australia
Cranbrook Education Campus, a state school in Cranbrook, Devon

See also
Cranbrook (disambiguation)